D.a.S. Theater  is a theatre in Cologne, North Rhine-Westphalia, Germany.

Theatres in Cologne